The Blues Roar (also released as Screamin' Blues) is an album released by Canadian jazz trumpeter Maynard Ferguson featuring tracks recorded in 1964 and originally released on the Mainstream label.

Reception

Scott Yanow of AllMusic awarded the album three stars out of five, describing it as a "fine set" and "the last recording by this excellent orchestra".

Track listing
 "Every Day I Have the Blues" (Arron Sparks) – 5:30  
 "Night Train" (Jimmy Forrest) – 9:00  
 "Mary Ann" (Ray Charles) – 3:21  
 "I Believe to My Soul" (Ray Charles) – 3:26  
 "What'd I Say"  (Ray Charles) – 2:30  
 "Baltimore Oriole" (Hoagy Carmichael, Paul Francis Webster) – 5:10  
 "Alright, O.K. You Win" (Mamie Watts, Sid Wyche) – 3:23  
 "I Got a Woman" (Ray Charles) – 3:31

Personnel 
Maynard Ferguson – trumpet, flugelhorn, valve trombone
Bernie Glow – trumpet
August Ferretti, Don Rader, Jimmy Nottingham, John Bello – trumpet, flugelhorn 
James Buffington, Ray Alonge – French horn
Bill Watrous, John Messner, Paul Faulise, Urbie Green, Wayne Andre – trombone
Don Butterfield – tuba
Charlie Mariano – alto saxophone, clarinet
Lanny Morgan – alto saxophone, clarinet, flute
Willie Maiden, Frank Vicari – tenor saxophone
Romeo Penque – tenor saxophone, flute, alto flute
Phil Bodner, Stan Webb – tenor saxophone, piccolo, oboe, alto flute, baritone saxophone, soprano saxophone, clarinet, contrabass saxophone 
Roger Pemberton – baritone saxophone
Barry Galbraith – guitar
Margaret Ross – harp
Mike Abene – piano
Richard Davis – bass  
Mel Lewis – drums
George Devens – percussion
Mike Abene, Willie Maiden, Don Sebesky – arrangements

References 

1965 albums
Maynard Ferguson albums
Mainstream Records albums
Albums produced by Bob Shad
Albums arranged by Don Sebesky